"Hair of the Dog" is the title track of Nazareth's 1975 album Hair of the Dog. It is sometimes called "Son of a Bitch" because of the repeated lyric in the hook ("Now you're messing with a son of a bitch").

Background 
The song is about a charming and manipulative woman who can get men to acquiesce to her every need. The singer is letting her know that she has met her match in him, a self-described "son of a bitch."

"Hair of the Dog" uses a talk box extensively during its bridge. The song's title, which does not appear in the lyrics, is a pun ("hair of the dog" = "heir of the dog" = "son of a bitch").

As a standalone song, it only charted in Germany, where it peaked at #44. In the United States, because the Hair of the Dog album was a top-20 hit on the album charts, the song received extensive airplay on album-oriented rock stations (despite "bitch" being a borderline profanity) and remains in the playlist of most classic rock formatted stations. In the US, it was released as the B-side of "Love Hurts".

Personnel

Nazareth
Dan McCafferty – vocals, talk box
Manny Charlton – guitars, synthesizer
Pete Agnew – bass, backing vocals
Darrell Sweet – drums, cowbell, tambourine, backing vocals

Cover versions

The song has been covered by many bands. Guns N' Roses recorded it on their 1993 album "The Spaghetti Incident?". This version features the signature guitar riff from the Beatles' "Day Tripper" as a gag at the end. 

The song is on the Britny Fox album Boys in Heat. Stone Rider covered the song on their 2008 album Three Legs of Trouble. 

It has also been covered by Paul Di'Anno, The Michael Schenker Group, and Warrant.

Personnel

Guns N' Roses
 W. Axl Rose – lead vocals
 Slash – lead guitar, talkbox
 Duff McKagan – bass, backing vocals
 Matt Sorum – drums
 Gilby Clarke – rhythm guitar, backing vocals

Britny Fox
 "Dizzy" Dean Davidson – vocals, rhythm guitar
 Michael Kelly Smith – lead guitar
 Billy Childs – bass
 Johnny Dee – drums

In other media
The original version of the song is featured in the first expansion pack of the video game Grand Theft Auto IV, titled The Lost and the Damned. It is featured on the in-game radio station Liberty Rock Radio. The song was also used in The CW show Supernatural in a Season 2 promotional advertisement.

The Girls Aloud song "Sexy! No No No..." features a sped-up sample of the song's guitar riff. The band is given a writing credit for the sample.

On January 26, 2010, a re-recording of the song was released as downloadable content for the rhythm video game Rock Band 2. However, it has since been delisted from the in-game store.

In 2014, the song was used in the film, Dumb and Dumber To, during Lloyd's fantasy about Harry's daughter.

In a 2003 GEICO television commercial

In the US, this was used in a TV commercial for Dodge.

On November 14, 2006 the original version of the song appeared in Season 1, Episode 7 of the Friday Night Lights television series.

Charts

Original Version

Guns N' Roses version

References

1975 singles
Nazareth (band) songs
Guns N' Roses songs
Songs written by Dan McCafferty
Songs written by Darrell Sweet (musician)
Songs written by Manny Charlton
1994 singles
1975 songs
A&M Records singles
Geffen Records singles
Vertigo Records singles